Ambrosia artemisiifolia, with the common names common ragweed, annual ragweed, and low ragweed, is a species of the genus Ambrosia native to regions of the Americas.

Taxonomy
The species name, artemisiifolia, is given because the leaves were thought to bear a resemblance to the leaves of Artemisia, the true wormwoods.

It has also been called the common names: American wormwood, bitterweed, blackweed, carrot weed, hay fever weed, Roman wormwood, short ragweed, stammerwort, stickweed, tassel weed.

Distribution
The plant is native to: North America across Canada, the eastern and central United States, the Great Plains, and in Alaska; the Caribbean on Cuba, Hispaniola, and Jamaica; and South America in the southern bioregion (Argentina, Chile, Paraguay, Uruguay), the western bioregion (Bolivia, Peru), and Brazil. The distribution of common ragweed in Europe is expected to expand northwards in the future due to climate change.

It is the most widespread species of the genus in North America, to which most of the other species of Ambrosia are endemic. During the summer it causes allergic reaction in those that are susceptible.

Description
Ambrosia artemisiifolia is an annual plant that emerges in late spring. It propagates mainly by rhizomes, but also by seed.

Its bloom period is July to October in North America. Its pollen is wind-dispersed, and can be a strong allergen to people with hay fever.

It produces 2–4 mm obconic green to brown fruit. It sets seed in later summer or autumn. Since the seeds persist into winter and are numerous and rich in oil, they are relished by songbirds and upland game birds.

Invasive species

Common ragweed, Ambrosia artemisiifolia, is a widespread invasive species, and can become a noxious weed, that has naturalized in: Europe; temperate Asia and the Indian subcontinent; temperate northern and southern Africa and Macaronesia; Oceania in Australia, New Zealand, and Hawaii; and Southwestern North America in California and the Southwestern United States. A scientific study investigated the genomic basis of invasiveness in Ambrosia artemisiifolia, introduced to Europe in the late 19th century, by resequencing 655 ragweed genomes, including 308 herbarium specimens collected up to 190 years ago. In invasive European populations, the study found selection signatures in defense genes and lower prevalence of disease-inducing plant pathogens. Together with temporal changes in population structure associated with introgression from closely related Ambrosia species, escape from specific microbial enemies likely favored the remarkable success of common ragweed as an invasive species.

Common ragweed is a very competitive weed and can produce yield losses in soybeans as high as 30 percent. Control with night tillage reduces emergence by around 45 percent. Small grains in rotation will also suppress common ragweed if they are overseeded with clover. Otherwise, the ragweed will grow and mature and produce seeds in the small grain stubble.

Its wind-blown pollen is highly allergenic.

Ragweed control
 several herbicides were effective against common ragweed, although resistant populations were known to exist. In 2007 several Ambrosia artemisiifolia populations were glyphosate resistant, exclusively in the USA.

 the ragweed leaf beetle, Ophraella communa, has been found south of the Alps in southern Switzerland and northern Italy. Many of the attacked plants were completely defoliated. Zygogramma suturalis was introduced to Russia, and then China, for ragweed control, with very positive initial results.

SMARTER is a European interdisciplinary network of experts involved in the control of ragweed, health care professionals, aerobiologists, ecologists, economists, and atmospheric and agricultural modellers.

Chemical composition, and uses

Sesquiterpene lactones and molluscicide
Three sesquiterpene lactones isolated from the aerial parts of Ambrosia artemisiifolia were identified as psilostachyin A, psilostachyin B and psilostachyin C. All of them have some molluscicidal activity against the small tropical freshwater snail Oncomelania hupensis.

Medicinal
Ambrosia artemisiifolia has been a traditional medicinal plant for Native American tribes, including the Cherokee, Lakota, Iroquois, Dakota, and Delaware.

Phytoremediation
Ambrosia artemisiifolia is used in phytoremediation projects remediating soil pollution, for removing heavy metals such as lead from contaminated soil.

Gallery

References

External links 

 
 Calflora Database: Ambrosia artemisiifolia (Annual ragweed, Common ragweed, Low ragweed)—non-native/naturalized species in California
 Jepson Manual eFlora (TJM2) treatment of Ambrosia artemisiifolia—non-native/naturalized species in California
 UC CalPhotos gallery: Ambrosia artemisiifolia

artemisiifolia
Flora of Canada
Flora of the Northeastern United States
Flora of the North-Central United States
Flora of the United States
Flora of the Southeastern United States
Flora of the Caribbean
Flora of southern South America
Flora of western South America
Flora of the Appalachian Mountains
Flora of the Great Lakes region (North America)
Flora of the Great Plains (North America)
Plants used in traditional Native American medicine
Plants described in 1753
Taxa named by Carl Linnaeus
Phytoremediation plants